In computing, TIME is a command in DEC RT-11, DOS, IBM OS/2, Microsoft Windows and a number of other operating systems that is used to display and set the current system time. It is included in command-line interpreters (shells) such as COMMAND.COM, cmd.exe, 4DOS, 4OS2 and 4NT.

Implementations

The command is also available in the Motorola VERSAdos, Intel iRMX 86, PC-MOS, SpartaDOS X, ReactOS, SymbOS, and DexOS operating systems as well as in the EFI shell. On MS-DOS, the command is available in versions 1 and later.

In Unix, the date command displays and sets both the time and date, in a similar manner.

Syntax
The syntax differs depending on the specific platform and implementation:

DOS

TIME [time]

OS/2 (CMD.EXE)
TIME [hh-mm-ss] [/N]

Note: /N means no prompt for TIME.

Windows (CMD.EXE)
 TIME [/T | time]

When this command is called from the command line or a batch script, it will display the time and wait for the user to type a new time and press RETURN. Pressing RETURN without entering a new time will keep the current system time. The parameter '/T' will bypass asking the user to reset the time. The '/T' parameter is supported in Windows Vista and later and only if Command Extensions are enabled.

4DOS, 4OS2 and 4NT
TIME [/T] [hh[:mm[:ss]]] [AM | PM]

/T:  (display only)
hh:  The hour (0–23).
mm:  The minute (0–59).
ss:  The second (0–59), set to 0 if omitted.

Examples

OS/2 (CMD.EXE)
Display the current system time:

[C:\]TIME
Current time is:  3:25 PM
Enter the new time:

Windows (CMD.EXE)
To set the computer clock to 3:42 P.M., either of the following commands can be used:

C:\>TIME 15:42
C:\>TIME 3:42P

4DOS, 4OS2 and 4NT
Display the current system time:

C:\SYS\SHELL\4DOS>TIME /T
19:30:42

See also
DATE (command)
date (Unix)
List of DOS commands
Date and time notation

References

Further reading

External links

 time | Microsoft Docs

Computer real-time clocks
Internal DOS commands
MSX-DOS commands
OS/2 commands
ReactOS commands
Windows commands
Microcomputer software
Windows administration